This is a list of diplomatic missions in the United States. At present, 177 nations maintain diplomatic missions to the United States in the capital, Washington, D.C. Being the seat of the Organization of American States, the city also hosts missions of its member-states, separate from their respective embassies to the United States.

Eight nations also attribute their missions at the United Nations in New York City as their official embassies to the United States. However, only those offices in New York City that serve as an official diplomatic mission to the United States are listed here. For a complete list of diplomatic missions to the United Nations, see List of current Permanent Representatives to the United Nations.

Only diplomatic missions operated by a foreign country are listed here. Honorary consulates, typically private offices designated to provide limited services on behalf of a foreign country, are not listed.

Embassies in Washington, D.C. 

The following 177 countries maintain embassies in Washington, D.C. as their primary diplomatic missions to the United States. Entries marked with an asterisk (*) have chanceries (embassy buildings) located on or near a portion of Massachusetts Avenue known as Embassy Row.

 
 
 
 
 
 *
 *
 
 *
 *
 
 
 
 
 
 *
 
 *
 
 
 *
 
 *
 *
 
 
 *
 
 *
 *
 
 *
 
 
 
 
 
 *
 
 *
 
 *
 
 
 
  (Timor-Leste)*
 
 
 
 
 
 *
 
 
 
 *
 
 
 
 
 
 
 *
 
 *
 
 
 *
  (Vatican City)*
 
 
 *
 *
 *
 *
 *
 
 *
 *
 
 *
 
 
 
 
 
 *
 
 *
 
 *
 
 
 
 
 *
 *
 *
 
 
 
 *
 
 
 
 
 
 
 
 
 
 
 
 
 
 
 *
 
 *
 
 
 *
 
 
 
 
 *
 *
 *
 *
 
 *
 
 *
 
 
 
 
 
 
 
 
 
 
 
 
 
 *
 *
 
 
 
 *
 
 
 
 
 
 
 *
 *
 *
 *
 *
 
 
 
 *
 
 *
 
 
 
 *

Permanent Missions to the Organization of American States (OAS) in Washington, D.C. 
The following member-states maintain permanent missions to the OAS. Member-states not listed here have their ambassadors to the United States concurrently accredited to the organization

Other missions/delegations to the United States in Washington, D.C.
The following countries or entities have missions in Washington, D.C., though they may not have full diplomatic relations with the United States government.

International Organizations
  – General Delegation
  – Mission
  – General Delegation

States with no relations
Interests sections are provided by protecting powers.
  – Iranian Interests Section, Embassy of Pakistan

Governments with limited recognition
The United States does not formally recognize the following states.
  – Representative Office
  – Representative Office
  – Economic & Cultural Representative Office
  – Representative Office
  – Representative Office

Territories
  (United Kingdom) – Representative Office
  (Spain) – Delegation of the Government
  (United Kingdom) – Representative Office
  (Kingdom of Denmark) – Representative Office
  (China) – Hong Kong Economic and Trade Office
  (Iraq) – Representative Office
  (Canada) – Representative Office

Other entities
  National Coalition for Syrian Revolutionary and Opposition Forces – Foreign Mission 
-Liaison Office
  Central Tibetan Administration – Office of Tibet

Missions in New York City

New York City is home to the General Assembly of the United Nations, and all 195 member and observer states send permanent delegations. Nine diplomatic missions in New York City listed below are also formally accredited as each country's official embassy to the United States. There are 116 missions in the city. All are consulates-general unless otherwise noted.

 
 
  (Embassy)
 
 
 
 
 
 
 
 
 
 
 
 
 
 
 
 
 
  (Economic & Cultural Office)
 
  (Embassy)
 
 
 
 
 
 
 
 
 
 
 
 
 
  (Consulate)
 
 
 
 
 
 
 
 
 
 , China (Economic and Trade Office)
 
 
 
 
 
 
 
 
 
 
 
 
 
  (Consular Post)
 
 
 
 
  (Embassy)
 
 
 
 
  (Embassy)
 
 
 
 
 
  (Representative Office)
 
 
 
 
 
 
 
 
 
 
 
 
 
 
  (Embassy)
  (Embassy)
 
 
 
  (Embassy)
  (Consulate)
 
  (Embassy)
 
 
 
 
 
 
 
 
  (Embassy)

Cities with ten or more consulates

Los Angeles

Los Angeles, the second-largest city in the United States, is home to 65 consular missions, more than any other city on the West Coast and any U.S. city except New York and Washington, D.C. Many of these consulates are located along Wilshire Boulevard.

 
 
 
 
 
 
 
 
 
 
 
 
 
 
  (Economic & Cultural Office)
  (Consulate General)
 
 
 
 
 
 
 
  (Consulate General)
 
 
  (Consulate General)
  (Consulate-General)
 
 
  (Consulate General)
 
  (Consulate General)
 
 
  (Consulate General)
 
 
 
 
 
  (Consulate General)
 
  (Consulate General)
 
 
  (Consulate General)
 
 
  (Consulate General)

Chicago

Chicago, the third largest city in the United States and the largest in the midwestern region of the country, is home to 55 missions, the fourth-most after Washington, D.C., New York and Los Angeles.

 
 
 
 
 
 
 
  (Consulate General)
 
  (Economic & Cultural Office)
  (Consulate General)
 
 
 
 
 
 
 
 
 
 
  (Consulate General)
  (Consulate-General)
 
 
 
 
 
  (Consulate General)
 
 
 
  (Consulate General)
 
 
 
 
  (Consulate General)
 
 
 
 
  (Consulate General)
  (Consulate General)
 
 
 
 
 
 
 
 
  (Consulate General)

Miami
Miami is home to 45 missions.  Due to its location, many Latin American and Caribbean countries maintain consulates there. Miami currently has the fifth-most diplomatic missions behind Washington, DC, New York, Los Angeles, and Chicago.

 
 
 
  (Consulate-General)
 
  
 
 
 
 
 
  (Economic & Cultural Office)
  (Consulate General)
 
 
 
  (in Doral)
 
 
 
  (Consulate-General)
 
 
  (Vice-consulate)
  (Consulate-General)
 
 
 
  (Consulate General)
  (Consulate General)
 
 
  (Consulate General)
  (Consulate General)
  (Consulate General)
 
  (in Coral Gables)

Houston

Houston is the fourth largest city in the United States and is home to 44 missions.

  (Consulate General)
 
 
 
  
  (Consulate General)
  (Consulate General)
 
  (Consulate General) 
 
 
 
  (Consulate-General)
 
 
  (Consulate)
  (Consulate-General)
 
  (Vice-consulate)
  
  (Consulate-General)
 
 
  (Consulate-General)
  (Consulate General)
  (Consulate General)
 
 
 
  (Consulate General)
 
  (Consulate General)
 
 
  (Consulate-General)
 
 
 
  (Economic & Cultural Office)
 
 
 
 
  (Consulate General)

San Francisco

San Francisco is home to 42 missions.

 
 
 
 
 
  (Economic & Cultural Office)
  (Consulate General)
 
  
 
 
  (Consulate General)
  (Consulate-General)
 
 , China (Trade Office)
 
  (Consulate General)
  (Consulate General)
 
 
  (Consulate General)
 
 
  (Consulate General)
 
 
 
 
  (Consulate General)
  (Consulate General)
 
 
 
 
 
 
 
  (Consulate General)
 
 
 
  (Consulate General)

Atlanta
 
Atlanta is home to 26 missions.

 
 
 
 
 
  (Economic & Cultural Office)
  (Consulate General)
 
 
 
 
  (Consulate)
  (Consulate-General)
 
 
 
  (Consulate General)
 
  (Consulate-General)
  (Consulate General)
 
 
  (Consulate General)

Boston
 
The Boston area of New England is home to 25 foreign missions. 

 
 
  (Consulate General)
  (Economic & Cultural Office)
  (Consulate General)
 
 
 
 
 
 
 
  (Consulate General)
 
 
  (Consulate General)
  (Consulate General)
  (Consulate General)
  (Consulate General)
  (located in Newton)
 
 
 
  (located in Cambridge)

Other cities with diplomatic missions
Many cities have only one or two consulates; these are often from Mexico (which has 50 missions in the United States), or Guatemala (which has 23), or Canada (which has 17), or Japan (which has 17).

Aurora, Colorado (1) 
  (Consulate-General)

Anchorage, Alaska (2) 
  (Consular office)
  (Consular office)

Austin, Texas (2) 
  (Consulate General)
  (Consulate General)

Brentwood, New York (1)

Charlotte, North Carolina (2)

Cleveland, Ohio (1)
  (Consulate General)

Columbus, Ohio (1)
  (Consulate)

Dallas, Texas (7)
 
 
  (Consulate)
 
  (Consulate General)
  (Consulate General)
  (Consular Office)

Del Rio, Texas (2)
  (Consulate)
  (Consulate)

Des Moines, Iowa (1)
  (Consulate)

Denver, Colorado (7)
 
  (Consulate-General)
  (Consulate General)
  (Consulate General)
  (Consulate General)
  (Economic & Cultural Office)
  (UK government office)

Detroit, Michigan (7)
 
  
 
  (Consulate-General)
  (Consulate-General)
  (Consulate)

Duluth, Georgia (1) 
  (Consulate-General)

El Paso, Texas (2)
 
  (Consulate General)

Elizabeth, New Jersey (1)

Fresno, California (2)

Hartford, Connecticut (2)
 
  (Consulate General)

Honolulu, Hawaii (8)
 
 
  (Consulate-General)
 
  (Consulate General)
  (Consulate General)
 
  (Economic & Cultural Office)

Lake Worth Beach, Florida (1)
 (Consulate)

Laredo, Texas (2)
 
  (Consulate)

Las Vegas, Nevada (2)
 
  (Consulate)

Mayagüez, Puerto Rico (1)

McAllen, Texas (4)
 
  (Consulate)

Minneapolis, Minnesota (3)
 
 
  (UK government office)

Nashville, Tennessee (2)
  (Consulate-General)
  (Consulate-General)

Newark, New Jersey (3)

  (Consulate General)
 
  (Consulate General)

New Bedford, Massachusetts (1)
 (Consulate)

New Haven, Connecticut (1)

New Orleans, Louisiana (6)
 
 
 
  (Consulate)
  (Consulate General)

Oklahoma City, Oklahoma (1)
  (Consulate-General)

Omaha, Nebraska (2)
  (Consulate-General)
  (Consulate)

Orlando, Florida (3)
  (Consulate General)
  (Consulate)
  (Consulate)

Pago Pago, American Samoa (1)

Palo Alto, California (2)

Paterson, New Jersey (1)
  (Consulate General)

Philadelphia, Pennsylvania (5)
 
  (Consulate-General)
 
  (Consulate)
  (Consulate General)

Phoenix, Arizona (4)
 
  (Consulate-General)
 
  (Consulate General)

Portland, Oregon (3)
  (Consular office)
 
  (Consulate)

Providence, Rhode Island (2)
  (Consulate-General)
  (Vice-consuate)

Raleigh, North Carolina (2)
  (Consulate-General)
  (Consulate General)

Riverhead, New York (1) 
  (Consulate)

Saint Paul, Minnesota (2) 
  (Consulate General)
  (Consulate)

Saipan, Northern Mariana Islands (2)
  (Consular Office)

San Bernardino, California (3)
  (Consulate General)
  (Consulate)
  (Consulate)

San Diego, California (3)
  (Consulate)
  (Consulate-General)
  (UK Government Office)

San Juan, Puerto Rico (7)
  (Consulate General)

Seattle, Washigton (9)
 
 
  (Consulate-General)
 
  (Consulate General)
  (Consulate)
 
  (Taiwan) (Economic & Cultural Office)
  (UK government office)

Silver Spring, Maryland (2)
 
  (Consulate)

Springdale, Arkansas (2)

Tampa, Florida (2)
  (Consulate General)
  (Consulate General)

Tamuning, Guam (6)
  (Economic & Cultural Office)
 
  (Consulate General)
 
  (Consulate General)
  (Consular Agency)

Tucson, Arizona (3) 
  (Consulate General)
  (Consulate)
  (Consulate General)

Woodbridge, Virginia (1)

Cities with Mexican consulates only (20)
Due to the large number of Mexican immigrants in the United States, Mexico has 52 consular missions in the United States, more than any sending country has with any other host country.  Many of these are smaller cities in the southwestern United States, including a number of border towns.

  Albuquerque, New Mexico (Consulate)
  Boise, Idaho (Consulate) 
  Brownsville, Texas (Consulate)
  Calexico, California (Consulate)
  Douglas, Arizona (Consulate) 
  Eagle Pass, Texas (Consulate)
  Indianapolis, Indiana (Consulate)
  Kansas City, Missouri (Consulate)
  Little Rock, Arkansas (Consulate)
  Milwaukee, Wisconsin (Consulate)

  New Brunswick, New Jersey (Consulate)
  Nogales, Arizona (Consulate General)
  Oxnard, California (Consulate)
  Presidio, Texas (Consulate)
  Sacramento, California (Consulate General)
  Salt Lake City, Utah (Consulate)
  San Antonio, Texas (Consulate General)
  San Jose, California (Consulate General) 
  Santa Ana, California (Consulate)
  Yuma, Arizona (Consulate)

Countries without formal diplomatic missions to the United States
Several countries do not have formal diplomatic missions accredited to the United States. Consular duties for each country—except Afghanistan, Kiribati, and non-UN members—are instead managed by their respective diplomatic missions to the United Nations in New York.

States with relations

  (The Embassy in Ottawa, Canada is accredited to the U.S.)

States with no relations

 
  (Interests Section in the Pakistani Embassy, Washington, DC)
 
  (UN observer, not recognized by US)

States with limited recognition

The United States does not recognize the following states.

Non-Independent Territories

Closed missions

See also

 Foreign policy of the United States
 List of diplomatic missions of the United States
 Ambassadors of the United States
 List of ambassadors to the United States
 Visa requirements for United States citizens

References

External links
 U.S. State Department Diplomatic List
 Foreign Embassies and consulates in Washington D.C.
 Diplomatic Missions in United States – embassies.info

 
Diplomatic missions in the United States
United States